Area code 859 serves the city of Lexington and the central portion of the Commonwealth of Kentucky.  It was created in a split from area code 606 in 1999.

Its service area encompasses the following Kentucky counties (the boundary closely, but not exactly, tracks county lines):

Boone County
Bourbon County
Boyle County
Campbell County
Clark County
Fayette County (coterminous with the city of Lexington)
Gallatin County
Garrard County
Grant County
Harrison County
Jessamine County
Kenton County
Madison County
Mercer County
Montgomery County
Nicholas County
Pendleton County
Washington County
Woodford County

By far the largest city in the 859 territory is Lexington.  The next largest area is Northern Kentucky, the Kentucky portion of the Cincinnati metropolitan area. It includes smaller cities and towns such as Nicholasville, Richmond, Danville, Covington, Versailles, Florence, Mount Sterling and Winchester.

The numbers 859 spell out "UKY" on a standard keypad—a nod to Lexington being home of the University of Kentucky.

When an area code is split, normal practice calls for the largest city to retain the old area code in order to minimize disruption. Thus, conventional wisdom would have suggested that Lexington and Northern Kentucky would have retained 606 in the 1999 split. Lexington was by far the largest city in the old 606 territory. Combined, Lexington and Northern Kentucky accounted for two-thirds of the old 606's population, along with the great majority of its landlines and cell phones. However, several counties in eastern Kentucky are among the poorest in the nation. The Kentucky Public Service Commission and BellSouth (now part of AT&T), then the region's main telephone carrier, decided to let the rural portion retain 606 in order to spare this notoriously impoverished area the added expense and burden of switching to a new area code.

Under current projections, 859 is expected to remain in its current configuration for the foreseeable future, and is nowhere near exhaustion. This is despite the fact that the Cincinnati local toll area extends into both Northern Kentucky and southern Indiana, meaning that several numbers in Cincinnati's 513 and the Indiana suburbs' 812/930 are not available for use.

Prior to October 2021, area code 859 had telephone numbers assigned for the central office code 988. In 2020, 988 was designated nationwide as a dialing code for the National Suicide Prevention Lifeline, which created a conflict for exchanges that permit seven-digit dialing. This area code was therefore scheduled to transition to ten-digit dialing by October 24, 2021.

See also

List of exchanges from AreaCodeDownload.com, 859 Area Code

References

859
859
Telecommunications-related introductions in 1999